is a passenger railway station in the city of Takasaki, Gunma, Japan, operated by East Japan Railway Company (JR East).

Lines

Station layout
The station consists of two opposed side platforms serving two tracks. The station building is elevated and is above and to a right angle with the platforms. The west side of the station is named the "Tonya entrance", and the east side is named "Kaizawa entrance". The station has a Midori no Madoguchi ticket office.

Platforms

History
The station opened on 16 October 2004. The name of the station is taken from the large tonyamachi (industrial estate for wholesale retailers) close by.

Passenger statistics
In fiscal 2019, the station was used by an average of 3950 passengers daily (boarding passengers only).

Surrounding area
 Takasaki Wholesale Retailer Industrial Estate
 Gumma Paz College
 Gunma Prefectural Takasaki Girls' High School
 Gunma Prefectural Takasaki Technical High School
 Gunma Prefectural Takasaki Commercial High School

See also
 List of railway stations in Japan

References

External links

 JR East Station information 

Stations of East Japan Railway Company
Railway stations in Gunma Prefecture
Railway stations in Japan opened in 2004
Jōetsu Line
Takasaki, Gunma